As of September 2021, TUI Airways operates to the following destinations.[2023]3March

List

References

Lists of airline destinations